Who Done It? may refer to:

 Who Done It? (1942 film), an Abbott and Costello film
 Who Done It? (1949 film), a Three Stooges short
 Who Done It? (1956 film), a British film comedy starring Benny Hill
 "Who Done It" (Dallas), an episode of Dallas
 "Who Done It?" (Yes, Dear), an episode of Yes, Dear

See also
 Whodunit, a type of detective story
 Whodunit (disambiguation)